The RD-843 is a Ukrainian single nozzle liquid propellant rocket engine burning pressure-fed UDMH and nitrogen tetroxide. It is rated for up to 5 restarts, and can gimbal up to 10 degrees in each direction.

It was developed by Yuzhnoye Design Bureau for Avio and is manufactured by Yuzhmash. It uses the RD-869 thrust chamber, the old Soviet ICBM SS-18 Satan final stage engine from which it is evolved, and which was also designed by Yuzhnoye. The RD-843 ground test campaign included 74 tests, 140 ignitions, reaching a total of 8201 s, which is approximately 12 service lives on 4 engines. As of June 2020 it has been successfully used on 14 orbital launches.

It is currently used as the main engine of Vega's AVUM upper stage.

See also
AVUM - The upper stage of the Vega rocket that uses the RD-843 as its main engine.
Vega - The ESA small rocket that uses AVUM.
Yuzhnoe Design Bureau - The RD-843 designer bureau.
Yuzhmash - A multi-product machine-building company that's closely related to Yuzhnoe and manufactures the RD-843.

References

External links
 Yuzhnoye Design Bureau English-language home page
 Yuzhmash Home Page
 Vega's User Manual

Rocket engines using hypergolic propellant
Rocket engines using the pressure-fed cycle
Yuzhnoye rocket engines
Yuzhmash rocket engines
Rocket engines of Ukraine